Richard Elliot(t) may refer to:

Politicians
Richard N. Elliott  (1873–1948), U.S. Representative from Indiana
Dick Elliott (politician) (1935–2014), American politician from South Carolina

Musicians
Richard Elliott (organist), principal organist of the Mormon Tabernacle Choir
Richard Elliot (born 1960), Scottish-born saxophone player

Others
Richard M. Elliot (1888–1918), American naval officer killed in World War I
Richard M. Elliott (1887–1969), American psychologist
Dick Elliott (1886–1961), American character actor

See also
Dickey Elliott, South African cricketer